De Laatste Passagier  is a 1961 Dutch film directed by Jef van der Heyden.

1961 films
Dutch black-and-white films